The New York Central Rail Road introduced a container system in 1922.

Specifications 

Details include:

 Width: 
 Length: 
 Height: 
 Tare weight

See also 

 Containerization
 Intermodal container
 Shipping container

References 

Containers
New York Central Railroad